Acanthobrama lissneri, or the Jordan bream, is a species of freshwater fish in the family Cyprinidae. It is found in Israel and Jordan. Its natural habitats are rivers and lakes, and is now commonly found in reservoirs.

Distribution and threats
The Jordan bream is found in the Jordan River drainage basin and the on the coastal plain of Palestine in the Nahr al-Muqatta (Qishon River). It has been introduced into the Azraq Wetland Reserve.

It is widely distributed and locally abundant, particularly in lakes such as Lake Kinneret, but there have been significant declines in riverine parts of its range. It is threatened by habitat loss as water extraction is impacting the lakes and rivers in this region. Pollution in the waters is also a threat in certain localities. Nevertheless, it is able to inhabit reservoirs and other artificial water bodies which compensates for the losses in rivers and streams.

References

lissneri
Fish described in 1952
Near threatened animals
Fish of Israel
Taxonomy articles created by Polbot